Albert Mwanza Mukombo (17 December 1945 - 13 October 2001) was a Congolese football defender who played for Zaire in the 1974 FIFA World Cup. He also played for TP Mazembe.

He is well-known among Argentine sticker collectors due to his sticker for the 1974 World Cup Album by Panini being near-impossible to collect due to its rarity.

References

External links
FIFA profile

1945 births
2001 deaths
Africa Cup of Nations-winning players
Democratic Republic of the Congo footballers
Democratic Republic of the Congo international footballers
Association football defenders
TP Mazembe players
1974 FIFA World Cup players
1968 African Cup of Nations players
1970 African Cup of Nations players
1972 African Cup of Nations players
1974 African Cup of Nations players
1976 African Cup of Nations players